Monvel may refer to :

Places 
 Monvel, Gujarat, western India, a village on Saurashtra peninsula
 Monvel State, India, a former princely state in Sorath Prant of Kathiawar, with seat in the above town

People 
 Pseudonym of French actor and comic playwright Jacques Marie Boutet (1745–1812)
 Louis Boutet de Monvel, (1941–2014), French mathematician
 Louis-Maurice Boutet de Monvel (1850–1913), French painter and illustrator